Duke Xuan of Qin (died 664 BC) was from 675 to 664 BC the twelfth ruler of the Zhou Dynasty state of Qin that eventually united China to become the Qin Dynasty.  His ancestral name was Ying, and Duke Xuan was his posthumous title.

Duke Xuan was the eldest of the three sons of his father Duke De of Qin, and succeeded his father as ruler of Qin when Duke De died in 676 BC, aged 34.  He reigned for 12 years and died in 664 BC.  Although Duke Xuan had nine sons, he passed the throne to his younger brother Duke Cheng of Qin, who would in turn pass the throne to the third brother Duke Mu of Qin.

References

Year of birth unknown
Rulers of Qin
7th-century BC Chinese monarchs
664 BC deaths